Katai may refer to:
 Katai, India
 Katai, Togo
 Aleksandar Katai (born 1991), Serbian footballer
 Yeerlanbieke Katai (born 1990), Chinese freestyle wrestler who competed at the 2016 Summer Olympics
 Kátai Tamás (born 1975), Hungarian avant-garde musician
 Katai Tayama (1872-1930), Japanese author

See also